Karl Friedrich Alfred Heinrich Ferdinand Maria Graf Eckbrecht von Dürckheim-Montmartin (24 October 1896 – 28 December 1988) was a German diplomat, psychotherapist and Zen master. A veteran of World War I, he was introduced to Zen Buddhism early in life. After obtaining a doctorate in psychology, he became an avid supporter of the Nazi Party. Following World War II he was imprisoned in Japan which transformed him spiritually. Upon returning to Germany he became a leading proponent of the Western esoteric spiritual tradition, synthesizing teachings from Christian Mysticism, Depth Psychology and Zen Buddhism.

Early life

Dürckheim was born in Munich, the son of Friedrich Georg Michael Maria Eckbrecht von Dürckheim-Montmartin (1858-1939) and Sophie Evalina Ottilie Charlotte von Kusserow (1869-1959). His maternal grandfather was the Prussian diplomat and politician Heinrich von Kusserow (1836-1900). His uncle was General Alfred Karl Nikolaus Alexander Eckbrecht von Dürckheim-Montmartin (1850-1912), aide-de-camp to King Ludwig II of Bavaria and later commander of the Royal Bavarian Infantry Lifeguards Regiment.

A descendant of old Bavarian nobility whose parents' fortune was lost during bad economic times, he grew up at Steingaden and at the Bassenheim Castle near Koblenz.

Military service
In 1914 he volunteered for the Royal Bavarian Infantry Lifeguards Regiment and was given a commission. He served on the front lines for 46 months and fought in France, Serbia, Slovenia, Italy and Romania. He saw action at the Battle of Verdun, the Battle of Caporetto, the Battle of the Somme, and the Lys Offensive. By his own account he never fired a shot and was never wounded, "though bullets went through my shirt and coat." Dürckheim considered his war experience fundamental to his later enlightenment: "I discovered...that it was in facing death that we step forward toward true life. That experience was later a part of my teaching: by accepting death, we discover and receive life which is beyond life and death."

In recognition of his military service, Dürckheim was awarded the Honour Cross of the World War 1914/1918 and the War Merit Cross First Class with swords.

Introduction to Eastern Thought
In 1919, as a 23-year-old officer on his return after the war, he refused to fight in defense of the Bavarian Socialist Republic, but instead joined the Freikorps under Franz Ritter von Epp (under whom he had served during World War I) and became involved in anti-Bolshevik activities, for which he was briefly imprisoned. Afterward, he worked as a journalist for several small anti-communist publications. He also rejected his inheritance of the family estate at Steingaden, to which he had a right as eldest son.

He met his first wife, Enja von Hattinberg (1888-1939), who introduced him to the Tao Te Ching of Lao-Tzu:

Meister Eckhart became very important for him. "I recognize in Eckhart my master, the master. But we can only approach him if we eliminate the conceptual consciousness."

Academic career
Dürckheim received his doctorate in Psychology from the University of Kiel in 1923 and taught at the Institute of Psychology there for another year, then went to work with Felix Krueger and Hans Freyer at the University of Leipzig where he received his habilitation on 17 February 1930. In 1931 he became a professor at the Medical Academy of Breslau. From 1930 to 1932 Dürckheim also taught at the Bauhaus in Dessau in the field of Gestalt psychology. During the 1930s he was close friends with Karl Haushofer, Else Lasker-Schüler, Paul Klee, Romano Guardini and Rainer Maria Rilke.

On 11 November 1933 Dürckheim signed the commitment of the professors at German universities and colleges to Adolf Hitler and the Nazi state.

Nazi career and years in Japan
In 1933 Dürckheim joined the Sturmabteilung. In 1934 he spent 6 months in South Africa on behalf of the Reich Minister of Education to contact Germans living there and to urge them not to abandon Nazism. During his visit he met secretly with the Afrikaner Broederbond to urge them to follow Nazi ideals, including anti-Semitism. By 1935 he had become chief assistant to Joachim von Ribbentrop, head of the Büro Ribbentrop and later Nazi Germany's Minister for Foreign Affairs. In that year Dürckheim brokered a meeting between Lord Beaverbrook and Hitler. In October 1936, Dürckheim accompanied newly appointed Ambassador Ribbentrop to England, where he was assigned "to find out what the English think of the new Germany." He was introduced to King Edward VIII and Winston Churchill. Dürckheim was at this time a fervent supporter of Nazism, writing in the Journal of the Nazi Teachers Association:
"The basic gift of the Nazi revolution is for all occupations and levels across the experience of our common nature, a common destiny, the common hope of the common leader....which is the living foundation of all movements and aspirations."

Jewish descent discovered
Then it was discovered that he was of Jewish descent. 
 Dürckheim's maternal great-grandmother Eveline Oppenheim (1805-1886) was the daughter of the Jewish banker Salomon Oppenheim. 
 Dürckheim was related to Mayer Amschel Rothschild. 
 Dürckheim's maternal grandmother was Antonie Springer, who was Jewish. 

Under Germany's 1935 Nuremberg Laws, he was considered a Mischling (mixed-blood) of the second degree and had therefore become "politically embarrassing". Ribbentrop decided to create a special mission for him to become an envoy for the foreign ministry and write a research paper titled "exploring the intellectual foundations of Japanese education."

Zen and Nazism while envoy to Japan
In June 1938 he was sent to Japan, residing there until 1947. Soon after arriving in Japan he met the Buddhist scholar Daisetsu Teitaro Suzuki who influenced his thinking profoundly. Professor Fumio Hashimoto, who was sent to Dürckheim as a translator, wrote: "Dürckheim was surrounded by Shinto and Buddhist scholars, as well as military and thinkers of the right, each of which tried to convince him of their importance." These included such leading figures as the Abbot Hakuun Yasutani and the Imperial Japanese Army General Sadao Araki. He became an avid student of Kyūdō (traditional Japanese archery) under the master Awa Kenzô (1880-1939), who had also taught Eugen Herrigel. He wrote in 1941: "Archery is a great exercise that provides a profound silent concentration. In Zen the body is not considered an obstacle to spiritual life, as it is too often regarded in the West. On the contrary, [in Zen] the body is considered instrumental to spiritual advancement."

Under Ribbentrop's guidance, he coordinated the dissemination of Nazi propaganda in Japan, likening German military ideals to Japanese bushido and encouraging the idea that Japan and Germany would share the world. The “Zen Samurai Bushido debate” had evolved in pre-war Germany over the relationship between Nazi ideals and those of the traditional Japanese warrior culture. On 15 July 1939 Dürckheim published an article in the third issue of the journal Berlin - Rome - Tokio in which he refers to the Japanese state cult, the glorified “Samurai spirit” and its relationship with Nazi ideology and antisemitism in Japan. He wrote:
“Who travels today through Japan experiences at every step the friendship with Nazi Germany and Fascist Italy to the Japanese people, especially those forces that affect the future more than political power. It is the spirit which connects Japan with us, that spirit which…is related to Japan’s iron will to win the war… In farm houses and businesses hang signs with the words: Everyone must behave as if they were on the field of battle.”

By 1944, Dürckheim had become a well-known author and lecturer in Japan on Zen meditation, archery, and metaphysics, and was awarded the War Merit Cross, Second Class on Hitler's birthday, 20 April 1944. The impending surrender of Germany did not prevent him from reasserting his values. "The immeasurable suffering of Germany will bring the German people to a higher level and help give birth to a better, less materialistic nation," he wrote to a friend in the last days of the war.

Arrest and imprisonment in Japan
After the war, Tokyo was occupied by the Americans. Dürckheim went into hiding in Karuizawa and was arrested on 30 October 1945 by Special Agent Robie Macauley of the US Counter-Intelligence Corps after being identified as the chief of Nazi propaganda in Japan.  He was imprisoned for 16 months in Sugamo Prison:
"In spite of everything, it was a very fertile period for me. During the first weeks, I had a dream almost every night, some of which anticipated my future work. In my cell I was surrounded by a profound silence. I could work on myself and that is when I began to write a novel. My neighbors simply waited for each day to pass. That time of captivity was precious to me because I could exercise zazen meditation and remain in immobility for hours."

Spiritual rebirth
Dürckheim interpreted his imprisonment as an initiation event that was preparing him for a spiritual rebirth. Influenced partly by the work of Julius Evola, the "conversion experience" later became an essential element of Dürckheim's psychotherapy: "There is real change whenever the individual experiences the supernatural, which alters the meaning of life 180 degrees and moves the axis from the middle of the natural human existence to a supernatural center." 

The criteria of an initiation conversion are 1) the conscious confrontation with a near-death experience during one's lifetime; 2) the "overcoming of humanity"; and 3) the transition from the everyday mode of being to another, which Evola calls transcendental realism (the transition from the everyday mode of being to another spiritual plane).

Work with Zen and psychotherapy
Dürckheim was repatriated to Germany in 1947 and began a period of training analysis with Leonhard Seif. At this time he began to develop his "Initiation Therapy", in which he merged several psychological directions. There is a strong influence from depth psychology, in particular the analytical psychology of Carl Gustav Jung and the psychodrama of Jacob Levy Moreno. Dürckheim employs similar elements of art (modelling clay, ink drawings) and drama (role-playing) in his form of therapy.

Along with his second wife, psychologist Maria Theresia Hippius (1909-2003), Dürckheim founded the Existential Psychology Training and Conference Center in the early 1950s, located in the Black Forest village of Todtmoos-Rutte. His books were based on his conferences.
"What I am doing is not the transmission of Zen Buddhism; on the contrary, that which I seek after is something universally human which comes from our origins and happens to be more emphasized in eastern practices than in the western."

In 1958 Dürckheim met Episcopalian priest Alan Watts, who described him as "...a true nobleman--unselfconsciously and by a long tradition perfect in speech and courtesy--Keyserling's ideal of the grand seigneur."

Dürckheim is identified by Albert Stunkard as the person who suggested that Stunkard should visit D. T. Suzuki in Kita-Kamakura, not far from the Sugamo prison. Stunkard later became Suzuki's psychiatrist.

In 1972 Dürckheim received the Humboldt plaque from the Humboldt Society of Science, Art and Culture, and in 1977 he was awarded the Officer's Merit Cross, 1st Class.

Dürckheim died in Todtmoos on 28 December 1988 at the age of 92.

Theory of therapeutic self-transformation

Dürckheim did not practice psychotherapy in the traditional sense, rather, he tried to teach his clients a process by which they could move towards spiritual self-understanding. He viewed the therapist as a spiritual guide: "A therapy which does not take into account the spirituality of man is doomed to failure...The therapist is not the one who heals, that is, who intervenes with his own skills; he is a therapist in the original meaning of the word: a companion on the way."

Concept of the self

Dürckheim readily acknowledged that he was influenced by other psychologists in the development of his theory of the self:

"In these last twenty years, the work of C. G. Jung and of his disciple Erich Neumann have greatly enriched me. Their theory of "self" corresponds to my concept of essential being. For them the true self is the integration of the deep self with the existential one, which alone gives birth to the person. This is what struck me: C.G.Jung has opened the way to initiation."

Dürckheim's "Initiation Therapy" deals with the encounter between the profane, mundane, "little" self (the ego) and the true Self:

"Man evolves through three kinds of "self": first, the "little self" who only sees power, security, prestige, knowledge. Then the "existential self" which goes much further: it wants to give itself to a cause, to a task, to a community, to a person. It can go beyond egocentrism and that is where it becomes, in my opinion, a human being. Finally what I call the "essential self," the true "I" of the individual and of humanity."

The Wheel of Metamorphosis

An integral concept in this self-understanding is referred to as "The Wheel of Metamorphosis." Dürckheim viewed transformation not as the sudden achievement of enlightenment, but rather as a continuous and cyclical evolution, akin to the motion of a wheel. He posited three stages and five steps in each cycle:

Stage 1: All that is contrary to essential being must be relinquished.
Step 1: Practice "critical watchfulness" (analytical awareness of one's own thoughts and behavior).
Step 2: Let go of all that stands in the way of becoming.
Stage 2: That which has been relinquished must be dissolved in transcendent Being which absorbs and recreates us.
Step 3: Union with transcendent Being.
Step 4: New becoming in accordance with the inner image which has arisen from transcendent Being.
Stage 3: The newly formed core must be recognized and personal responsibility taken for its growth.
Step 5: Practicing this new form on a daily basis through critical watchfulness, which leads us back to Step 1.

Meditation

For Dürckheim, meditation exercises are the key to spiritual change:

"Exercise has a double purpose: to prepare the individual for the possibility of an experience of Being and for his metamorphosis into a witness of this experience awakening within. For illumination does not make an enlightened one! The more I penetrated into the experience and the wisdom of the exercise of Buddhism, the more it was clear that here was a universal understanding of the human being and his possibilities. This was a vision which, taking into account the liberation and salvation of man through health, efficiency and social fidelity, apprehended man in his deepest essence, whose experience and integration were also the conditions for the development of his true Self."

Quotations

Books
 
 Zen and Us. Arkana Publishing, 1991. English. 144 pp. ASIN: B00072HEP0
 
 
 The Way of Transformation: Daily Life as Spiritual Exercise (London: Allen & Unwin, 1971)
 The Japanese cult of tranquility. Rider, 1960. English. 106 pp. ASIN: B0006AXFRE.
 Wunderbare Katze, Otto Wilhelm Barth (February 1, 2011);  (in German)

Notes

References

Sources
 
 
 Hans Thomas Hakl, "Karlfried Graf Dürckheim", in: Wouter J. Hanegraaff: Dictionary of Gnosis & Western Esotericism. Vol. I. Brill, Leiden 2005, pp. 323–325.

External links
 Becoming Real: Essays on the Teachings of a Master by Alphonse and Rachel Goettmann, translated by Theordore J. Nottingham
 Alphonse Goettmann, Dialogue on the Path of Initiation: The Life and Thought of Karlfried Graf Dürckheim, Nottingham Publishing, 1998.
 The Dürckheim Centre (in German)

1896 births
1988 deaths
German Army personnel of World War I
German diplomats
Bavarian nobility
Academic staff of the Bauhaus
German scholars of Buddhism
Sturmabteilung personnel
Officers Crosses of the Order of Merit of the Federal Republic of Germany
People from the Kingdom of Bavaria
Military personnel from Munich
German psychotherapists
University of Kiel alumni
Academic staff of Leipzig University
Academic staff of the University of Breslau
Zen Buddhism writers
20th-century German writers
20th-century German philosophers
Nazi propaganda
German people of Jewish descent
20th-century German male writers